Fithceallach mac Flainn (died 691) was the 16th King of the Uí Maine.

Little seems to be known of his reign, and the annals merely report his death. No other details are given.

Notes

References

 Annals of Ulster at CELT: Corpus of Electronic Texts at University College Cork
 Annals of Tigernach at CELT: Corpus of Electronic Texts at University College Cork
Revised edition of McCarthy's synchronisms at Trinity College Dublin.
 Byrne, Francis John (2001), Irish Kings and High-Kings, Dublin: Four Courts Press,

External links
 Commentary by Dan M. Wiley (The Cycles of the Kings Web Project)

People from County Galway
People from County Roscommon
691 deaths
7th-century Irish monarchs
Year of birth unknown
Kings of Uí Maine